Ruweida Mohamed Obo was born in 1978, in Pate Island, Lamu County. She is a Kenyan politician.

Early Life and education
Born in Pate Island, Lamu County, she attended Ndau Primary School in Lamu and later transferred to Ngomeni Primary School in Kilifi County. She attended Coast Girls' High School in Mombasa County for her O-levels education. She received her private pilot's licence from the Kenya School of Flying in October 2002.  She worked as the line captain at Mombasa Air Safari for 13 years.

Career
She was elected Lamu Woman Representative in 2017, on the Jubilee Party ticket. In 2022, vying on a Jubilee Party ticket, she became the first woman to be elected Member of Parliament for Lamu East Constituency, on.

References

Kenyan politicians